The New Theatre in Plzeň is a Czech theatre. Construction of the venue cost 880 million CZK. The first performance at the New Theatre was The Bartered Bride from Bedřich Smetana.

References

External links
 
  

Theatres completed in 2014
Buildings and structures in Plzeň
Music venues completed in 2014
Theatres in Plzeň
2014 establishments in the Czech Republic
21st-century architecture in the Czech Republic